Tiongui is a small town and commune in the Cercle of Kolondieba in the Sikasso Region of southern Mali near the border with Ivory Coast. In 1998 the commune had a population of 6,004.

References

Communes of Sikasso Region